Siah Sang-e Jadid (also Romanized as Sīāh Sang-e Jadīd; also known as Sīāh Sang) is a village in Karasht Rural District, in the Bumehen District of Pardis County, Tehran Province, Iran. At the 2006 census, its population was 1,350, in 414 families.

References 

Populated places in Pardis County